For the Canadian-American political activist, see W. J. H. Traynor
William Bernard Traynor VC (31 December 1870 – 20 October 1954) was an English recipient of the Victoria Cross, the highest and most prestigious award for gallantry in the face of the enemy that can be awarded to British and Commonwealth forces.

Details
Traynor was born at 29 Moxon Street, Hull, East Riding of Yorkshire.  He was 30 years old and a sergeant in the 2nd Battalion, The West Yorkshire Regiment (The Prince of Wales's Own), British Army during the Second Boer War when the following act led to the award of the Victoria Cross:  

Traynor's Cross is held privately.

References

Monuments to Courage (David Harvey, 1999)
The Register of the Victoria Cross (This England, 1997)
Victoria Crosses of the Anglo-Boer War (Ian Uys, 2000)

External links
Location of grave and VC medal (Kent)
Dover War Memorial Project
Angloboerwar.com

West Yorkshire Regiment soldiers
Second Boer War recipients of the Victoria Cross
British recipients of the Victoria Cross
Military personnel from Kingston upon Hull
1870 births
1954 deaths
British Army personnel of the Second Boer War
British Army recipients of the Victoria Cross